Locws International is a contemporary arts organisation, based in Swansea, South Wales, UK. They work with British and international artists to create visual responses to aspects of the city’s heritage, landscape and people, most notably through their Locws and Art Across the City events.

Artworks are often temporary and are generally site-specific sculptures, installations, performances or moving image based, cited in accessible public spaces, both indoors and out.

The organisation was originally set up in 1999 by Swansea-based artists David Hastie and Tim Davies. It is an artist-led charity and maintains an ongoing educational outreach project working in schools in the Swansea area.

Permanent artworks 

Ten artworks remain permanent fixtures including:

Bristow & Lloyd’s Coming Soon mural (2011) was removed when the Bush Inn, High Street was demolished in 2013.

Art Across the City 2015 

The artists commissioned for Art Across the City which ran from 21 March – 1 June 2015 were: Michael Stumpf, Graham Dolphin, Emily Speed, Colin Priest, David Cushway.

Art Across the City 2014 

The artists commissioned for Art Across the City which ran from 12 April – 1 June 2014 were: Jon Burgerman, Jeremy Deller, Craig Fisher, Thomas Goddard, Nick Jordan, Jeremy Millar, Lisa Scantlebury, Ross Sinclair, Bob & Roberta Smith, Ultimate Holding Company and writers: Niall Griffiths, Rhian Edwards, Rachel Trezise

Art Across the City 2013 

The artists commissioned for the Art Across the City 2013 Spring programme were: Pete Fowler, Olaf Breuning, Sinta Tantra, David Long, Philip Cheater. For the Autumn programme were: Jacob Dahlgren, Juneau Projects, Laura Sorvala, Mathew Houlding

Art Across the City 2012 

The artists commissioned for the Art Across the City event which ran from 29 September – 11 November 2012 were: David Blandy, Jock Mooney, Fiona Curran, David Marchant, Joanne Tatham and Tom O’Sullivan, Sean Puleston, Rik Bennett

Locws International projects 2011 

The artists commissioned for Locws International projects in 2011 were: Simon and Tom Bloor, Bristow & Lloyd, Holly Davie, Alex Duncan, Helen Edling, Mark Folds, Laura Ford, S Mark Gubb, Rhys Himsworth, Maider López, Bedwyr Williams.

Locws International projects 2010 

The artists commissioned for Locws International projects in 2010 were: Tine Bech, Jackie Chettur, Rebecca Spooner, Simon Whitehead.

Art Across the City and Locws International projects 2009 

The artists commissioned for the Art Across the City event which ran from 18 April to 10 May 2009 were: Tanya Axford, Megan Broadmeadow, Neville Gabie, Paul Granjon, Neeme Külm, Marko Mäetamm, Aisling O’Beirn, Calum Stirling. Artists commissioned for Locws International projects 2009 were: Bermingham and Robinson.

Locws International projects 2008 

Artists commissioned for Locws International projects, 2008 were: Richard Higlett, Jennie Savage.

Locws 3, Art Across the City 2007 

The artists commissioned for Locws 3 which ran from 14 April to 13 May 2007 were: Rhona Byrne, Milena Dopitova, Carwyn Evans, Rebecca Gould, Torsten Lauschmann, Niamh McCann, Sara Rees, Helen Sear, Jaan Toomik, Zoe Walker & Neil Bromwich.

Locws 2 2002 

The artists commissioned for Locws 2 which ran from 7 to 29 September 2002 were: Davide Bertocchi, Enrica Borghi, Angharad Pearce Jones, Brigitte Jurack, Annie Lovejoy, Alice Maher, Paul & Paula, Anthony Shapland, Catriona Stanton, Grace Weir, Daphne Wright.

Locws 1 2000 

The artists commissioned for Locws 1 which ran from 2 September to 1 October 2000 were: Eric Angels, Iwan Bala, Maud Cotter, Dorothy Cross, Tim Davies, Peter Finnemore, Rose Frain, Hughes Germain, David Hastie, Karen Ingham, Philip Napier, Tina O’Connoll, Benoit Sire, Lois Williams, Craig Wood.

References

External links 
 Locws International

Contemporary art organizations